Grok is a word coined by Robert Heinlein meaning 'to know intimately'.

Grok may also refer to:

 Grok (JPEG 2000), a graphics library
 Grok (web framework), an open-source web framework based on Zope Toolkit technology
 Grok Knowledge Base, at Louisiana State University
 Grok Magazine, an Australian free student magazine
 Google Kythe, originally known as Project Grok
 Grok, a programming language created by Ric Holt

See also
 Groklaw, a defunct website
 OpenGrok, a source code search and cross reference engine
 Grock (1880–1959), Swiss clown and musician
 Grook, a form of short aphoristic poem
 The Groke, a fictional character from the Moomins